Kaymaz  is a  town in the Sivrihisar district of  Eskişehir Province, Turkey. The population of Kaymaz was 1254 as of 2012. The town is an historical settlement and it was named as Troknada during the Phyrgiaan kingdom. Later it was renamed as Kaytrus and eventually the name Kaymaz was adopted.

In 1963, it was declared a seat of township. There are various ruins around the town. In contrast to general scenery of Central Anatolia, Kaymaz is a watery town thanks to Kaymaz Dam to the north east of the town. It is also known as Yeşilkaymaz ("Green Kaymaz"). Beans and cherries are the main products of the town.

It has an annual Festival of Kuru Fasulye ("Festival of haricot")

See also
Kuru fasulye

References

External links

Resim Galerisi - Kaymaz Beldesi For images

Populated places in Eskişehir Province
Towns in Turkey
Sivrihisar District